Gineb Macalinao (born May 15, 1969) known as Lovely Rivero, is a Filipino actress who started in the kiddie-show, Kaluskos Musmos in 1980 (second batch). She made a comeback in the late '80s as one of the mainstays of That's Entertainment and as a teenage actress in Baby Pascual and Associate's Chikas (1984) with Jaclyn Jose, Karla Kalua, Rachel Anne Wolfe and Tanya Gomez. Other film credit includes Sex Object (1985) with Stella "Pinky" Suarez, Jr. and Julio Diaz.

In 1996-1998 she starred the time blocker soap Mukha Ng Buhay with Shintaro Valdez Pilar Pilapil and Bernadette Allyson for Vintage Television or Viva Television

Filmography

Television
{| class="wikitable"
! Year !! Title !! Role !! Network
|-
| 1986–1996 || That's Entertainment || Host/Performer || GMA Network
|-
| 1996 || Bayani || Gregoria de Jesús || rowspan="5"|ABS-CBN
|-
| 2000 || Maalaala Mo Kaya: Apples, Oranges & Bananas || Older Sister
|-
| 2001 || Recuerdo de Amor || Diana
|-
| 2005–2006 || Mga Anghel na Walang Langit || Pilar
|-
| 2007 || Komiks Presents: Pedro Penduko at ang mga Engkantao || Joy
|-
| rowspan="2"| 2008 || Zaido: Pulis Pangkalawakan || Mrs. Torres || rowspan="3"|GMA Network
|-
| Codename: Asero || Myar
|-
| 2009 || Sine Novela: Kung Aagawin Mo Ang Lahat Sa Akin || Vicky
|-
| 2010 || Maalaala Mo Kaya: Headband || Amy || ABS-CBN
|-
| rowspan="2"| 2011 || Magic Palayok || Linda Sallave || GMA Network
|-
| Maalaala Mo Kaya: Pasaporte || Grace || ABS-CBN
|-
| 2012 || Alice Bungisngis and her Wonder Walis || Tiya Panying || GMA Network
|-
| rowspan="2"| 2013 || Maalaala Mo Kaya: Gown || Oyang || ABS-CBN
|-
| Magpakailanman: The Prolen Banacua Story || Virginia || rowspan="11"|GMA Network
|-
| rowspan="3"| 2014 || Magpakailanman: Nakakulong na Puso || Lisa
|-
| Innamorata || Corazon "Cora" Isidro-Manansala
|-
| Magpakailanman: Ang Nurse Na Mat Ikatlong Mata || Mama Rene
|-
| rowspan="5"| 2015 || Second Chances || Loretta Paredes
|-
| Maynila: Happily Ever After ||
|-
| Magpakailanman: PO2 Ephraim Mejia Story || Helen
|-
| The Half Sisters || Julie
|-
| Beautiful Strangers || Imelda Rodriguez 
|-
|  2016 || Once Again || Vicky
|-
| 2017 || Wish Ko Lang: Paghilom || Ms. Torquemada
|-
| 2017–2018 || The Good Son || Miriam De Guzman || ABS-CBN
|-
| rowspan="2"| 2018 || Maynila: Ganti ng Anak || Vivian || GMA Network
|-
| Playhouse || Cielo Reyes-Domingo || ABS-CBN
|-
| 2019 || Sahaya || Pantia Kamaya || GMA Network 
|-
| rowspan="5"| 2021 || Maalaala Mo Kaya: Blouse || Zhenny Justol || Kapamilya Channel
|-
| First Yaya || Viola || GMA Network
|-
| Init sa Magdamag || Helen Salcedo || rowspan="4" |Kapamilya Channel 
|-
| Viral Scandal ||
|-
| Maalaala Mo Kaya: Dialysis Machine || Mila
|-
| rowspan="2"| 2022 || Mars Ravelo's Darna || Noah's Mother
|-
| Start-Up PH || Rhodora "Dang" Navarro || rowspan="2" |GMA Network 
|-
| 2023 || Stolen Life 
|}

Selected movies
 Chikas (1984)
 Sex Object (1985)
 Angel Cremenal (1990)
 Kamay ni Cain (1992)
 Itumba si Angel Delgado (1992)
 Angelina: The Movie (1992)
 Estribo Gang: The Jinggoy Sese Story (1992)
 Silang Mga Sisiw sa Lansangan (1993)
 Magkasangga sa Batas (1993)
 Sgt. Alvarez: Ex-Marine (1993)
 Manila Boy (1993)
 Maestro Toribio: Sentensyador (1994)
 Deo Dador: Berdugo ng Munti (1994)
 Alyas Totoy: Kamay Na Bakal Ng WPD (1994)
 Chinatown 2: The Vigilantes (1994)
 Dino Obrero: Haring Daga (1994)
 Nestor Solis: Hari ng Oxo (1995)
 Judge Max Asuncion: Hukom Bitay (1995)
 Hatulan Bilibid Boys 2 (1995)
 Gen. Tapia: Sa Nagbabagang Lupa (1995)
 Alfredo Lim: Batas ng Maynila (1995)
 Kandungan (1995)
 Kamandag Ko ang Papatay Sa 'Yo (1997) as Emily
 Pagbabalik ng Probinsyano'' (1998)

References

External links
 

1969 births
Living people
People from Davao City
Actresses from Davao del Sur
Filipino film actresses
Filipino television actresses
GMA Network personalities
ABS-CBN personalities